The Permanent Representative of Afghanistan to the United Nations is the Islamic Republic of Afghanistan's foremost diplomatic representative to the United Nations. The permanent Representative  is the head of a diplomatic mission to the Headquarters of the United Nations in New York City. The Permanent Representative of Afghanistan to the United Nations has headed the Permanent Mission of Afghanistan to the United Nations since Afghanistan became a UN Member State on 19 November 1946.

The current Permanent Representative of Afghanistan is Naseer Ahmad Faiq.

List of Afghan Permanent Representatives to the United Nations
This is a list of Permanent Representatives of Afghanistan to the United Nations.

Note: Since December 2021, Afghanistan U.N. Mission diplomat Naseer Faiq has served as Afghanistan's chargé d’affaires to the UN. Taliban government of Afghanistan's pick for UN Ambassador Mohammad Suhail Shaheen remains unrecognized.

See also

 Afghanistan and the United Nations
 List of current Permanent Representatives to the United Nations
 Foreign relations of Afghanistan
 Diplomatic missions of Afghanistan

References

External links
 Official website of the Permanent Mission of Afghanistan to the UN
 Official Twitter feed of the Permanent Mission of Afghanistan to the UN

Afghanistan and the United Nations

Afghanistan